Giselle Paulina Delgado Castillo (born 17 March 1988) is a Chilean female professional squash player and also serves as a coach. Giselle achieved her highest career ranking of 117 in March 2017 during the 2016-17 PSA World Tour.

She moved to Canada in 2002 and currently resides there but has represented her home nation, Chile in international competitions including the 2018 South American Games and 2019 Pan American Games. She graduated from the University of Western Ontario in 2006.

She claimed two bronze medals in women's doubles and women's team events at the 2019 Pan American Games representing Chile.

References 

1988 births
Living people
Chilean female squash players
Pan American Games bronze medalists for Chile
Squash players at the 2015 Pan American Games
Squash players at the 2019 Pan American Games
South American Games bronze medalists for Chile
South American Games medalists in squash
Competitors at the 2018 South American Games
University of Western Ontario alumni
People from Antofagasta
Pan American Games medalists in squash
Medalists at the 2019 Pan American Games
20th-century Chilean women
21st-century Chilean women